Modius Julius was a governor of Britannia Inferior, a province of Roman Britain during AD 219 under Elagabalus. Inscriptions at Birdoswald and Netherby attest to his rule although little else is known of him.

See also
 Modia (gens)

References

Roman governors of Britain
Ancient Romans in Britain
3rd-century Romans